Cajonos may refer to:

Geography
San Pedro Cajonos, Oaxaca
San Mateo Cajonos, Oaxaca
San Francisco Cajonos, Oaxaca

History
Martyrs of Cajonos

Languages
Cajonos Zapotec